In mathematics, a Bianchi group is a group of the form

where d is a positive square-free integer.

The quotient space  is a non-compact, hyperbolic 3-fold with finite volume, which is also called Bianchi orbifold. An exact formula for the volume, in terms of the Dedekind zeta function of the base field , was computed by Humbert as follows.

It is well known that every non-cocompact arithmetic Kleinian group is weakly commensurable with a Bianchi group.

References

External links
 Allen Hatcher, Bianchi Orbifolds

Group theory